Isode or ISODE may mean:

ISO Development Environment (ISODE), an implementation of the OSI upper layer protocols which was widely used in the Internet research community during the late 1980s and early 1990s.
isode or iso'de is the name of the communal dwellings of the Piaroa, an indigenous American ethnic group living along the banks of the Orinoco River in Venezuela.